Pacific Junction is a city in Mills County, Iowa, United States. The population was 96 at the time of the 2020 census.

History
Pacific Junction was established by the railroad in 1871 to serve as the western terminus of the Burlington and Missouri River Railroad, the eastern terminus of the Nebraska Burlington & Missouri River RR, and a station on the Kansas City, Council Bluffs, & Saint Joseph Railroad.  All three were consolidated as part of the Chicago, Burlington and Quincy Railroad, today's BNSF.  After several rough and tumble years of growth Pacific Junction was incorporated in 1882.  The scene of violence during the Burlington Railroad Strike of 1888, PJ's population peaked during the early 20th century with just over 700 people. Railroad traffic through town remains almost constant although the town's connections to the railroad have declined significantly since 1971.  Historic structures include the 1914 Pacific Junction Public School which graduated its last high school class in 1961 and closed for good in 1986. On the early morning of December 3, 2021, two BNSF trains collided two locomotives and 16 cars derailed in Pacific Junction.

Pacific Junction was impacted by the 2019 Midwestern U.S. floods. Buyout funding has been allocated for local residents.

Geography
Pacific Junction is located at  (41.018319, -95.799883).

Demographics

2010 census
As of the census of 2010, there were 471 people, 196 households, and 138 families living in the city. The racial makeup of the city was 96.0% White, 0.6% Native American, 0.4% Pacific Islander, 1.3% from other races, and 1.7% from two or more races. Hispanic or Latino of any race were 2.1% of the population.

There were 196 households, of which 24.0% had children under the age of 18 living with them, 54.6% were married couples living together, 9.7% had a female householder with no husband present, 6.1% had a male householder with no wife present, and 29.6% were non-families. 22.4% of all households were made up of individuals, and 10.7% had someone living alone who was 65 years of age or older. The average household size was 2.40 and the average family size was 2.75.

The median age in the city was 45.1 years. 18.3% of residents were under the age of 18; 7.8% were between the ages of 18 and 24; 23.8% were from 25 to 44; 36.5% were from 45 to 64; and 13.6% were 65 years of age or older. The gender makeup of the city was 48.2% male and 51.8% female.

2000 census
During the census of 2000, there were 507 people, 196 households, and 148 families living in the city. The racial makeup of the city was 96.84% White, 0.20% Native American, 0.59% Asian, 0.39% Pacific Islander, 0.20% from other races, and 1.78% from two or more races. Hispanic or Latino of any race were 0.99% of the population.

There were 196 households, out of which 33.2% had children under the age of 18 living with them, 56.6% were married couples living together, 14.8% had a female householder with no husband present, and 24.0% were non-families. 18.9% of all households were made up of individuals, and 10.2% had someone living alone who was 65 years of age or older. The average household size was 2.59 and the average family size was 2.91.

24.9% are under the age of 18, 9.5% from 18 to 24, 27.2% from 25 to 44, 26.4% from 45 to 64, and 12.0% who were 65 years of age or older. The median age was 39 years. For every 100 females, there were 92.0 males. For every 100 females age 18 and over, there were 86.8 males.

The median income for a household in the city was $36,563, and the median income for a family was $40,333. Males had a median income of $28,750 versus $25,089 for females. The per capita income for the city was $15,103. About 5.6% of families and 7.6% of the population were below the poverty line, including 12.9% of those under age 18 and 2.3% of those age 65 or over.

Education
The city is in the Glenwood Community School District.

References

External links

Cities in Mills County, Iowa
Cities in Iowa
1871 establishments in Iowa
Populated places established in 1871